Pusionella ghanaensis is a species of sea snail, a marine gastropod mollusk in the family Clavatulidae.

Description
The length of the shell attains 25 mm.

Distribution
This species occurs in the Atlantic Ocean off Ghana.

References

 Boyer F. & Ryall P. 2006. Two new Clavatulinae species (Caenogastropoda: Turridae) from Ghana. Iberus 24(2): 33–38

External links
 

Endemic fauna of Ghana
ghanaensis
Gastropods described in 2006